The 1982–83 season was the 68th season of the Isthmian League, an English football competition.

Wycombe Wanderers were champions, winning their seventh Isthmian League title. There was no promotion from the Isthmian League to the Alliance Premier League till 1985. Worthing finished second in Division One achieving the second promotion in a row.

Premier Division

The Premier Division consisted of 22 clubs, including 20 clubs from the previous season and two new clubs, promoted from Division One:
Bognor Regis Town
Wokingham Town

At the end of the season Leytonstone & Ilford changed name into Leytonstone/Ilford.

League table

Division One

Division One consisted of 21 clubs, including 17 clubs from the previous season and four new clubs:

Two clubs relegated from the Premier Division:
Boreham Wood
Harlow Town

Two clubs promoted from Division Two:
Cheshunt
Worthing

League table

Division Two

Division Two consisted of 22 clubs, including 18 clubs from the previous season and four new teams:

Two clubs relegated from Division One:
Clapton
Ware

Two clubs joined from the Athenian League:
Leyton-Wingate
Uxbridge

At the end of the season Dorking Town were renamed Dorking.

League table

References

Isthmian League seasons
I